Caenopedina indica is a species of sea urchins of the Family Pedinidae. Their armour is covered with spines. Caenopedina indica was first scientifically described in 1903 by de Meijere.

References

Animals described in 1903
Pedinoida